Enterprise Productions, Inc., otherwise known as The Enterprise Studios, was an independent production company co-founded by actor John Garfield alongside producers David L. Loew and Charles Einfeld in 1946, right after Garfield's contract with Warner Bros. had expired. Having recently turned freelance, the idea was Garfield's outlet in obtaining creative control over his own projects, as well as encouraging fellow filmmakers to pursue their own humanistic advocacies through their work.

Garfield made two films with Enterprise: Body and Soul (1947) and Force of Evil (1948). Other productions include Arch of Triumph (1948), starring Ingrid Bergman and Charles Boyer; and Caught (1949), directed by Max Ophüls and starring James Mason and Barbara Bel Geddes.

During its existence, Enterprise had its films distributed by United Artists from 1947 to mid-1948. The last three films were distributed by Metro-Goldwyn-Mayer.

Eventually, after the box-office failure that Force of Evil brought (as well as Garfield's trouble with the House Un-American Activities Committee), Enterprise folded in 1949. The film Caught was its last production. The careers of Robert Rossen, the director of Body and Soul, and Abraham Polonsky, director of Force of Evil, were seriously affected by HUAC.

The entire catalog is currently owned by ViacomCBS, whose Melange Pictures holding unit owns the former library of predecessor-in-interest Republic Pictures, while Paramount Pictures distributes.

Select films
Ramrod (1947)
The Other Love (1947)
Body and Soul (1947)
Arch of Triumph (1948)
So This Is New York (1948)
Four Faces West (1948)
No Minor Vices (1948)
Force of Evil (1948)
Caught (1949)

References

Film production companies of the United States
Mass media companies established in 1946